Carex iynx, the tussock sedge (a name it shares with other members of its genus), is a species of flowering plant in the family Cyperaceae, native to South Australia, New South Wales, Victoria, and Tasmania in Australia, and introduced to the North Island of New Zealand. It superficially resembles Carex tasmanica, the curly sedge.

References

iynx
Endemic flora of Australia
Flora of South Australia
Flora of New South Wales
Flora of Victoria (Australia)
Flora of Tasmania
Plants described in 1944